Enigma may refer to:
Riddle, someone or something that is mysterious or puzzling

Biology
ENIGMA, a class of gene in the LIM domain

Computing and technology
Enigma (company), a New York-based data-technology startup
Enigma machine, a family of German electro-mechanical encryption machines
Enigma, the codename for Red Hat Linux 7.2
Enigma (DVB), the second generation of Enigma software

Film
Enigma (1982 film), a film starring Martin Sheen and Sam Neill
Enigma (2001 film), a film adapted from the Robert Harris novel
Enigma (2009 film), a short film by the Shumway Brothers

Literature
Enigma (novel), a 1995 novel by Robert Harris
Enigma (DC Comics), a DC Comics character
Enigma (Marvel Comics), a Marvel Comics character
Enigma (Vertigo), a title published by DC's imprint Vertigo
Enigma (manga), a 2010 manga published in Weekly Shōnen Jump
Enigma Cipher, a series from Boom! Studios
Enigma, a novel in The Trigon Disunity series by Michael P. Kube-McDowell
"Enigma" and "An Enigma", two poems by Edgar Allan Poe
The Riddler, DC comics character whose full name abbreviates to E. Nigma

Music
Enigma (German band), an electronic music project founded by Michael Cretu 
Enigma (British band), a 1980s band
Enigma Records, an American rock and alternative record label in the 1980s
Enigma Variations, 14 variations composed by Edward Elgar

Albums
Enigma (Ill Niño album) (2008)
Enigma (Tak Matsumoto album) (2016)
Enigma (Keith Murray album) (1996)
Enigma (Aeon Zen album) (2013)

Songs
"Enigma (Give a Bit of Mmh to Me)", 1978, by Amanda Lear
"Enigma", 2007, by Amorphis from Silent Waters
"Enigma", 2002, by Trapt from Trapt
"Enigma", 2014, by Within the Ruins from Phenomena
"Enigma", 2020, by Lady Gaga from Chromatica

Places
Enigma, Georgia
Enigma, Tennessee
Enigma Peak, a mountain in Palmer Land, Antarctica

Television
Enigma (Derren Brown), a televised tour show
Enigma (Canadian TV series), a Biography Channel TV series
Enigma (Thai TV series), a television drama series
"Enigma" (NCIS), an episode of NCIS
"Enigma" (Stargate SG-1), an episode of Stargate SG-1
Enigma, a character from Nip/Tuck

Transport
Enigma (yacht), a private superyacht 
Dynamic Sport Enigma, a Polish paraglider design
Enigma Motorsport, a British motor-racing team

Video games
Enigma (1998 video game)
Enigma (2007 video game)
Enigma: Rising Tide, a 2003 video game
Enigma, a character from Dota 2
"The Enigma", an episode of the video game Batman: The Enemy Within

Other uses
The Enigma (performer), American
Enigma (roller coaster), Pleasurewood Hills, Suffolk, England
Copenhagen Post & Tele Museum (Enigma - Museum for Post, Tele og Kommunikation), the national Danish postal museum
The Enigma, a monthly publication of the National Puzzlers' League
Enigma, mathematical puzzles published in New Scientist 1979–2013
The Enigma (diamond), the world's largest cut diamond

See also
Ænigma (disambiguation)
Enigmata (disambiguation) 
Enigmatic (disambiguation)
Lady Gaga Enigma, a concert residency
Publius Enigma, an unsolved Internet puzzle
23 enigma, a belief in the significance of number 23